Anchiale is a genus of stick insects in the family Phasmatidae and tribe Phasmatini.  Species have a known distribution from Australasia.   The type species, A. maculata, was originally thought to be a Mantis.

Species 
Anchiale includes the following species:
 Anchiale austrotessulata Brock & Hasenpusch, 2007
 Anchiale briareus (Gray, 1834)
 Anchiale buruense Hennemann, Conle & Suzuki, 2015
 Anchiale caesarea (Redtenbacher, 1908)
 Anchiale confusa Sharp, 1898
 Anchiale grayi (Montrouzier, 1855)
 Anchiale insularis Kirby, 1904
 Anchiale longipennis (Montrouzier, 1855)
 Anchiale maculata (Olivier, 1792) - type species (as Mantis maculata Olivier, AG)
 Anchiale marmorata (Redtenbacher, 1908)
 Anchiale modesta Redtenbacher, 1908
 Anchiale reticulata (Palisot de Beauvois, 1805)
 Anchiale simplex Redtenbacher, 1908
 Anchiale spinicollis (Gray, 1833)
 Anchiale stolli Sharp, 1898
 Anchiale tessulata (Goeze, 1778)

References

External links

Phasmatodea genera
Phasmatidae
Phasmatodea of Asia